State Route 43 (SR 43) is a state route from Cummings Hill Road and Intervale Road in Temple to U.S. Route 2 (US 2) and US 2A in Old Town.

Route description
Route 43 begins at an intersection with Cummings Hill Road and Intervale Road in Temple. It heads east into Farmington. The route joins U.S. Route 2 and State Route 4. U.S Route 2 leaves the routes and State Route 27 joins the routes. Route 43 heads east and junctions State Route 148. State Route 148 stays just north of the route. Then the routes have a concurrency to Anson at U.S. Route 201A and State Route 8. Route 43 crosses a river into Madison and intersects U.S. Route 201. Route 43 continues to head east and has a concurrency with State Route 150. Then it has a concurrency with State Route 151. Then it has a concurrency with State Routes 23 and 152. Route 43 heads eastward again and now the route is finally alone. Then it turns northward with State Route 11. Then the routes intersect State Route 15. After East Corinth the route is alone again. But then it has a concurrency with State Route 221. Then the route heads southeast and crosses Interstate 95 and has its eastern end at U.S. Route 2.

Major junctions

SR 43A

There used to be a State Route 43A. It used what is now part of State Route 148.

References

External links

Floodgap Roadgap's RoadsAroundME: Maine State Route 43

043
Transportation in Franklin County, Maine
Transportation in Penobscot County, Maine
Transportation in Somerset County, Maine